Bobbin Head is a point on Cowan Creek in the north of the suburb of North Turramurra, New South Wales, Australia.  It is a "near-urban" part of Ku-ring-gai Chase National Park.  Bobbin Head is easily reached by taking Bobbin Head Road through North Turramurra or Kuringai Chase Road, Mount Colah near Hornsby.

Facilities at Bobbin Head include a marina, picnic areas with gas barbecues, a licensed restaurant and kiosk at the marina, small boat hire at the marina, and a lunch-time restaurant in what used to be the Bobbin Head Inn, which also contains a National Parks information centre. The area also contains many fire trails and a mangrove boardwalk. Aboriginal engravings can be observed along some of the bushwalk trails.  There is also a discovery trail along the waterfront inside the marina that chronicles the history of the area.

History

The Bobbin Inn was built by the Ku-ring-gai Chase Trust in 1936. The inn was officially opened by Mr Stevens, Premier of New South Wales, on 5 March 1937.

References

External links
  [CC-By-SA] 

Sydney localities